Team Hawaii was a soccer team based out of Honolulu that played in the NASL for one season, 1977. Their home field was Aloha Stadium. 

After two unsuccessful years as the San Antonio Thunder, the franchise moved to Hawai'i in time for the 1977 season. The club was originally coached by Hubert Vogelsinger, but after he became ill midway through the season, Charlie Mitchell took over and served as player-coach for the remainder of the campaign. On the field, Hawaii had an 11-15 record and failed to qualify for the playoffs; at the box office, the team never came close to filling their 50,000-seat stadium. (A decent crowd of 12,877 attended their match against the New York Cosmos in April, but none of their other twelve home games drew even half of that; they managed only 4,543 per game for the season.)

Being thousands of miles away from their opponents, travel became a significant issue for Team Hawaii. The club would often go on four- or five-game road trips to the mainland, while visiting teams would usually coordinate playing in Hawaii with games against west coast teams.

With the poor attendances and high travel costs, the club lost an estimated $500,000 to $1 million in 1977. After speculation the franchise would move to Milwaukee, Atlanta or Houston, Team Hawaii officially shifted to Tulsa on November 14, 1977, to become the Tulsa Roughnecks.

To date, they remain Hawaii's only major professional soccer team and one of two major professional sports teams to play in the state (the other being The Hawaiians that played in the WFL in 1974-75).

1977 roster
Last updated April 20, 2009.

Year-by-year

Notes

 
Defunct soccer clubs in Hawaii
North American Soccer League (1968–1984) teams
1977 establishments in Hawaii
1977 disestablishments in Hawaii
Team Hawaii